Hamza Bendelladj, born either in 1988 or in 1989 in Tizi Ouzou, is an Algerian cyber-criminal and a carder who goes by the code name BX1 and has been nicknamed the "Smiling Hacker".  Bendelladj is a polyglot speaking 5 languages often used in profit in view of his linguistic knowledge in order to extract money almost everywhere in the world. This led to a search for him that lasted 5 years. He was on the top 10 list of the most wanted hackers by Interpol and the FBI for allegedly embezzling tens of millions of dollars from more than two hundred American and European financial institutions, via a computer virus, the "SpyEYE Botnet" that infected more than 60 million computers worldwide (mostly from the United States), which he developed with his Russian accomplice Aleksandr Andreivich Panin, aka "Gribodemon", to steal banking information stored on infected computers.

Mode of operation 
Using malicious software called "SpyEye", Bendelladj under the pseudonyms "BX1" or "Daniel HB", broke into the computers of the banks or private individuals to acquire passwords and identification codes. Once he took control of an account, he emptied them.

Arrest 
After a three-year chase, Bendelladj was arrested on January 7, 2013 by Thai police while making a stopover in Bangkok in transit between Malaysia and Egypt. He did not resist arrest. He said goodbye to his family as he was arrested and his wife and daughter continued their journey to Egypt without him. He earned the nickname "Smiling Hacker" due to the smile on his face during his media presentation on all the photos taken after his arrest even when handcuffed. According to Thai police, Bendelladj was in the top 10 most wanted by the FBI.

Despite much false information on the internet Bendelladj did not get sentenced to death, and claims saying he donated any money to charity are almost impossible to verify. Trial documents did not mention any donations or charity activities.

Extradition to the United States 
He was extradited in May 2013 to the United States. He was tried in Atlanta where he pleaded guilty on June 25, 2015. He faced a sentence of up to 30 years in prison and a fine of fourteen million dollars.

His accomplice Aleksandr Andreevich Panin was arrested on July 1, 2013, at Atlanta Hartsfield-Jackson International Airport and pleaded guilty in January 2014 to the Atlanta Federal Court.

Support on social networks 
In 2015, a Tunisian website posted a rumor that Bendelladj had been sentenced to death. This rumor spread on social networks in Algeria and several Facebook support groups were created in reaction to support him. A petition was launched demanding that the Algerian Ministry of Foreign Affairs and President Barack Obama intervene for his release. The US ambassador to Algeria, Joan A. Polaschik wrote on her Twitter account, "that computer crimes are not capital crimes and are not punishable by the death penalty".

Conviction in the United States 
Bendelladj has been in prison in the United States since May 2013, with the US court sentencing him on April 20, 2016, to 15 years in prison and 3 years of probation. His Russian accomplice Panin, 27, aka "Gribodemon", was sentenced to 9 years and 6 months.

In their report, the United States Department of Justice estimated the "SpyEye" virus had stolen approximately a billion dollars. Between 2010 and 2012, the affected banks repaired the damage caused by this malware. Bendelladj's lawyer announced that he intended to appeal against the court's decision.

Notes and references 

1988 births
Living people
21st-century Algerian people
Hackers
Identity theft
People from Tizi Ouzou
Phreaking
Security breaches